Jonas Lindberg (born 24 March 1989) is a Swedish footballer who plays as a forward for GAIS.

Club career
On 4 November 2015 he signed a deal with Sarpsborg 08 for 2 years.

References

External links

Jonas Lindberg Profile Altomfotball

1989 births
Living people
Swedish footballers
Association football midfielders
GAIS players
Ljungskile SK players
IK Sirius Fotboll players
Swedish expatriate footballers
Sarpsborg 08 FF players
Eliteserien players
Skövde AIK players
Expatriate footballers in Norway
Swedish expatriate sportspeople in Norway
Footballers from Gothenburg